John Nye may refer to:
John Nye (scientist) (1923–2019), English physicist and glaciologist
John Nye (cricketer) (1914–2002), English cricketer